Dulwich International High School Zhuhai is an international senior high school in Zhuhai, Guangdong, China. It is on the property of YungWing School Zhuhai. It is affiliated with Dulwich College.

See also 

 Dulwich College Beijing
 Dulwich College London
 List of international schools
 Dulwich International College
 Dulwich College Shanghai
 Dulwich International High School Suzhou

References

External links
 Dulwich International High School Zhuhai

High schools in Guangdong
International schools in Guangdong
Buildings and structures in Zhuhai
Dulwich College
British international schools in China
Private schools in Guangdong